Catherine Hay (1910–1995), born Rose Hughes, was a New Zealand historical romance novelist. She grew up on a farm in Te Kuiti and supported her writing career through clerical work.

List of works
Julia Deverell (1962)
The Singing Water (1963)
Halo Round the Moon (1964)
A Falcon Rising (1966)
The Barrier (1968)
The House at Stormy Waters (1970)

References

New Zealand romantic fiction writers
 1910 births
 1995 deaths
New Zealand women writers